Wang Yunkun (born December 1942) is a Chinese politician who served as governor of Jilin from 1995 to 1998, Communist Party Secretary of Jilin from 1998 to 2006, and chairman of Jilin Provincial People's Congress from 1999 to 2008.

He was a member of the 15th and 16th Central Committee of the Chinese Communist Party. He was a member of the Standing Committee of the 11th National People's Congress. He was a representative of the 19th National Congress of the Chinese Communist Party.

Biography
Wang was born in Liyang County, Jiangsu, in December 1942, during the Republic of China. In 1961, he was accepted to Tianjin University, majoring in radio technology. After graduation in 1968, he was assigned to the Chemical Machinery Plant of Jilin Chemical Industry Company, and worked there for eleven years.

In July 1982, he became vice mayor of Jilin City, rising to mayor in March 1983. He was appointed head of Jilin Provincial Mechanical and Electronic Industry Department in January 1986, concurrently serving as director of Jilin National Defense Science, Technology and Industry Office. He was director of Jilin Provincial Economic System Reform Commission in January 1988 and than secretary-general of Jilin Provincial People's Government in May of that same year. In March 1989, he became vice governor of Jilin. He took up the post of party secretary of Changchun which he held only from November 1992 to June 1995, although he remained a vice governor of Jilin until December 1992. In June 1995, he was promoted to acting governor, confirmed in February 1996. He was elevated to party secretary of Jilin in August 1998, the top political position in the province. He concurrently served as chairman of Jilin Provincial People's Congress between February 1999 and January 2008. In March 2008, he was made vice chairperson of the National People's Congress Agriculture and Rural Affairs Committee.

References

1942 births
Living people
People from Liyang
Tianjin University alumni
Governors of Jilin
People's Republic of China politicians from Jiangsu
Chinese Communist Party politicians from Jiangsu
Members of the 15th Central Committee of the Chinese Communist Party
Members of the 16th Central Committee of the Chinese Communist Party
Members of the Standing Committee of the 11th National People's Congress